Germain David-Nillet is a French painter born 4 December 1861 in Paris and died on 12 October 1932 in Paris.

Biography

He was a pupil of Léon Lhermitte. He exhibited at the Paris Salon in 1889 receiving an honourable mention and was elected to the Salon in 1895 ("Sociétaire"). He was awarded a silver medal at the great Paris Exposition universelle of 1900 and was made a Chevalier de la Légion d'honneur. He also won a gold medal in Munich in 1892, received an honourable mention in Madrid in 1893, and gold medals in Rouen in 1897 and Amsterdam in 1899. In 1934 the Salon of the Société nationale des beaux-arts staged a retrospective exhibition of his work. He was a "genre" painter. He met with Maurice Denis whilst in Saint-Brieuc.

Works
Paintings by David-Nillet include-
 "Autoportrait de face, barbe et moustache".  This work is held by the Paris Musée du Louvre département des Arts.
 "Calvaire de Tronoen (Morbihan)".  This work is held in Nantes' Musée des beaux-arts.
 "Façade de la cathédrale de Rouen, 1ère étude". This work is held in Rouen's Musée des beaux-arts.
 "Façade de la cathédrale de Rouen. 2ème étude". This work is held in Rouen's Musée des beaux-arts.
 "La Cathedral de Chartres". This work is held in Rouen's Musée des beaux-arts.
 "La Cathedral de Rouen". This work is held in Rouen's Musée des beaux-arts.
 "Le Jube de la Chapelle Saint Fiacre au Faouët". This work is held in Rouen's Musée des beaux-arts.
 "Le Labourer et Ses Enfants". This work is held in the Le Puy-en-Velay Musée Crozatier.
 "Le nouvea Ne". This work is held in Troyes' Musée d'art d'archéologie et de sciences naturelles.
 "Leon Lhermitte". This work is held in the Musée d'Orsay.
 "Les grandes Arbres". This work is held in Anger's Musée des beaux-arts.
 "La Veuve". This work is held in Pau's Musée des beaux-arts.
 "La soupe". This work is held in Paris' Musée du Louvre département des Arts graphiques.
 "La visite au malade". This work is held in Paris' Musée du Louvre département des Arts graphiques.
 "Le Bénédicité".  This work is held in Nantes' Musée des beaux-arts.
 "Maternite, Bretonne allaitant son Enfants". This work is held in Rouen's Musée des beaux-arts.
 "Oliviers à Cagnes (Var)". This work is held in Nantes' Musée des beaux-arts.
 "Portail de l'Eglise de Caudebec". This work is held in Rouen's Tribunal de Commerce.
 "Peines de la vie".  This work is held in Paris' Musée du Louvre département des Arts graphiques.
 "Place du Faouet, le soir".  This work is held in Nantes' Musée des beaux-arts.
 "Vieille Femme Priant". This work is held in the Musée d'Orsay.
 "Vieille femme priant, assise devant une fenêtre". This work is held in Paris' Musée du Louvre département des Arts graphiques.

Paintings depicting churches
 "Eglise Saint-Germain-l'Auxerrois". This painting is held in the Issoire Mairie.
 "Eglise Saint-Bonnet à Bourges".  This painting is held by the Ministère des postes in Paris.

Gallery
Some of David-Nillet's works are shown below.

See also
Some photographs of David-Nillet's work.

References

19th-century French painters
French male painters
20th-century French painters
20th-century French male artists
Breton art
19th-century French male artists